Marcel Granollers and David Marrero were the defending champions but Granollers decided not to participate.
Marrero played alongside Rubén Ramírez Hidalgo. In the final they lost to Sergei Bubka and Adrián Menéndez, 5–7, 2–6.

Seeds

Draw

Draw

External Links
 Main Draw

UniCredit Czech Open - Doubles
2011 Doubles